Brian Graham (born 23 November 1987) is a Scottish football striker and coach, who plays for Scottish Championship club Partick Thistle, and is also the manager of Partick Thistle W.F.C. in the Scottish Women's Premier League.

A striker, Graham spent five years at Greenock Morton after joining the club from Hillington. Whilst at Morton he spent a season on loan at East Stirlingshire in the Third Division. He then played for Raith Rovers, moving from there to Dundee United in 2013. After spending most of the 2014–15 season on loan to St Johnstone, he joined Ross County in June 2015. Graham was released from Ross County and signed for Hibernian in August 2016. He helped Hibernian win the 2016–17 Scottish Championship, then moved to English club Cheltenham Town in August 2017. Graham returned to Ross County in August 2018.

Playing career

Greenock Morton
Born in Glasgow, Graham made his senior début for Greenock Morton on 29 April 2006, at Station Park, Forfar against Forfar Athletic. He replaced that season, in order to come into contention for the first team, Allan Moore ordered him and Kevin Kelbie to lose weight (despite being one of the thinnest at the club).

Raith Rovers
After leaving Morton at the end of the 2010–11 season, he signed for Raith Rovers in May 2011. He scored 11 goals in his first season at Stark's Park, two behind top scorer John Baird. Graham went on to 28 times in his second season at the club as they finished 6th in the First Division.

Dundee United
Graham was unveiled as a Dundee United player before the SPL club's last game of the 2012–13 season against Celtic at Tannadice, signing a two-year deal as Jon Daly made an exit. Graham was mainly used as a substitute in his first season, with 23 of his 36 appearances coming from the bench. He scored his first goal for the club in a 4–1 win over Partick Thistle, and went on to finish the season with seven goals in total.

St Johnstone (loan)
In August 2014, Graham was loaned to St Johnstone for the rest of the 2014–15 season. He scored the winning goal on his St Johnstone debut on 30 August 2014 in a 1–0 win away to Motherwell, in the 86th minute, having come on as a substitute. On 20 December 2014, Graham scored from the penalty spot to give St Johnstone a 1–0 win over Inverness Caledonian Thistle, with the penalty being awarded after he appeared to be fouled by Inverness goalkeeper Dean Brill; however, in the days following the match, he was offered a two-match suspension by the Scottish Football Association's compliance officer after it had been alleged he had dived to win the penalty. St Johnstone accepted the two-match suspension.

Ross County (first spell)
In April 2015, Dundee United announced Graham would be released when his contract expires at the end of the season. It was announced by Ross County in May 2015 that Graham would be joining the club on a two-year contract. He scored 11 goals in his first season at the club and started the 2016 Scottish League Cup Final victory over Hibernian, which gave County their first ever piece of silverware.

Graham began the 2016–17 season in fine form, scoring in all four of Ross County's group stage matches in the reformatted League Cup. He scored the winner in a 1–0 win against Montrose, followed by a 75th-minute penalty against his former club, Raith Rovers to rescue a 1–1 draw the following week. He also netted in a 3–2 to Alloa, and despite scoring a hat-trick as County thrashed Cove Rangers 7–0 on 30 July, it proved to be not enough as the club finished third in their group and thus failed to qualify for the knockout round. A 3–1 defeat to Dundee on the opening day of the Scottish Premiership season proved to be Graham's last match for Ross County as he was released by the club on 19 August 2016, despite having a year left on his contract.

Hibernian
He signed for Hibernian the next day on a free transfer, although County later received a fee as Hibs gained promotion to the Premiership.

Cheltenham Town
Graham signed for EFL League Two club Cheltenham Town in August 2017.

Ross County return
Graham rejoined Ross County on 2 August 2018 after leaving Cheltenham at the end of the 2017–18 season.

Partick Thistle
Graham signed for Scottish Championship club Partick Thistle on a 2 and a half year deal, knocking back offers from Premiership sides, Motherwell, Kilmarnock and St. Johnstone.  Graham scored on his debut in a 2–1 defeat away to Arbroath. 
Scottish football was stopped in March 2020 due to the COVID-19 pandemic, at which time Partick were in last place in the Championship (two points behind 9th place Queen of the South, although Partick had a game in hand). A vote was subsequently taken to curtail the Championship, League One and League Two seasons, which meant that Partick were relegated to League One.

Graham remained at the club, ahead of the 2020–21 season in League One. 
After winning League One with Thistle and finishing as the club’s top scorer with 11 goals, Graham signed a new contract adding an extra year to his deal, extending it until 2023.

Graham scored his first hat-trick for Thistle in a 3-3 draw away to Inverness on the 9th of February 2022.

Managerial career
In September 2020 Graham was appointed manager of Partick Thistle W.F.C. in the second tier of the Scottish Women's Premier League, heading a coaching team comprising three players from the club's men's team.

Career statistics

Club

Honours

Club
Ross County
 Scottish League Cup: 2015–16
 Scottish Championship: 2018–19
 Scottish Challenge Cup: 2018–19

Hibernian
 Scottish Championship: 2016–17

Partick Thistle
 Scottish League One: 2020–21

Individual
SPFL Championship Player of the Month: April 2019

References

External links

1987 births
Living people
Footballers from Glasgow
Scottish footballers
Scottish Football League players
Scottish Professional Football League players
Greenock Morton F.C. players
East Stirlingshire F.C. players
Raith Rovers F.C. players
Dundee United F.C. players
Association football forwards
St Johnstone F.C. players
Ross County F.C. players
Hibernian F.C. players
Cheltenham Town F.C. players
Partick Thistle F.C. players
Scottish football managers
Scottish Women's Premier League managers